Most Likely to Succeed may refer to:
Most Likely to Succeed (film)
Luckyiam's Most Likely to Succeed